Money is a 1993 Indian Telugu language comedy thriller film written and directed by Siva Nageswara Rao. Produced by Ram Gopal Varma, the film stars J. D. Chakravarthy, Chinna, Jayasudha, Renuka Shahane, Paresh Rawal, Kota Srinivasa Rao, Brahmanandam, Sharat Saxena, and Tanikella Bharani. The film marks the directorial debut of Siva Nageswara Rao. It is also the first film in a lead role for J. D. Chakravarthy. It is loosely based on the American film Ruthless People (1986). It was made on a budget of 55 lakh and collected a distributor share of over 3 crore. The success of the film led to two sequels titled Money Money (1995), and Money Money, More Money (2011). The film was remade in Hindi as Love Ke Liye Kuch Bhi Karega (2001). The film won three Nandi Awards.

Plot
The film mentions what people will do for money and that money is equal to God on earth. Chakri (J.D. Chakravarthy) and Bose (Chinna) are two unemployed youth. While Bose prefers to make money an honest way, despite his numerous setbacks in finding a job, Chakri is constantly trying to score big, even if means resorting to dishonorable tactics, believing that being honest won't bring more money. Bose is in love with his landlord's daughter Renu (Renuka Shahane), but cannot bring himself to ask for her hand in marriage since he cannot prove he can provide for her, and the fact that they are also overdue on rent. After learning her father is looking for matches for her, Bose asks for her hand in marriage but gets insulted and rejected by her father. Renu then gives Bose an ultimatum: if he cannot marry her, she would commit suicide. Chakri tells him later that all his honest efforts have failed, and if Renu follows through on her ultimatum, Bose would be blamed. Caught in a dilemma, Bose reluctantly agrees to kidnap their wealthy neighbor Vijaya (Jayasudha) for easy money. Vijaya is married to Subba Rao (Paresh Rawal) who had married her when he had no money. Vijaya's father made her the sole beneficiary of his inheritance before he died, leaving Rao's luxury and his job at his wife's mercy. Rao is also neck-deep in debt, and having an affair, but cannot pay them off due to his wife's control of their money. Rao constantly hires a hitman to kill his wife for the property, but all end in failure. Resolving to kill her on his own, Rao's plan is thwarted when Bose and Chakri inadvertently kidnap her and keep her locked up in their own room to avoid suspicion. They then call her husband and demand a ransom for his release, to his delight. After threatening to kill her unless the ransom is paid, Rao instead offers more than the ransom if they kill her themselves, leaving them puzzled. Meanwhile, Renu, having found out what the duo did, asks them to come clean to Vijaya about their intent. Bose and Chakri reveal to Vijaya their intent behind the kidnapping, as well as her husband's response, proving it by having her listen to the ransom call and hearing her husband asking them to kill her for extra. 
In the meantime, police are called and after their investigation, the officer in charge (Sharat Saxena), suspects Rao of having killed his wife and arrests him, but Rao's lawyer argues that without the body, all evidence is circumstantial. The lawyer advises Rao in private that if he indeed killed his wife, he should ensure that her body is not found. Panicking, Rao tries to call the kidnappers, but they (with Renu and Vijaya playing along to catch him in the act) pretend to kill her and dump her body in Golconda Fort. In a parallel story, Khan Dada (Bramhanandam) a rowdy that Chakri often borrows from, usually misleading him into thinking he can make it big in movies, is approached by a talent scout Manikyam (Tanikella Bharani) who promises to make him a star in exchange for investment in his own movie. In reality, Manikyam is a failed talent scout and conman, who misleads people into giving him money in exchange for promising them a film role. After realizing he was conned, Khan tracks down and kills Manikyam. Panicking, he runs away to the Golconda Fort. Arriving at the fort, Chakri, Bose, and Renu, along with her father and Vijaya, try to scare Rao into admitting his guilt, made difficult by Khan's appearance. When the police are called to the fort, Rao runs away and hides in a car bound for Gujarat. After admitting to the officer the plan and Rao's plot to murder her, Vijaya hires Bose and Chakri in her company and has Bose and Renu happily married. The film ends with Subba Rao in a dhaba in Gujarat, resorting to hiding under a bed whenever police come into the dhaba.

Cast
 J.D. Chakravarthy ... Chakri
 Chinna ... Bose
 Jayasudha ... Vijaya
 Renuka Shahane ... Renu
 Paresh Rawal ... Subba Rao
 Kota Srinivasa Rao
 Bramhanandam ... Khan Dada
 Sharat Saxena ... Police Officer
 Tanikella Bharani ... Manikyam

Awards
Nandi Awards - 1993
 Second Best Feature Film - Silver - Ram Gopal Varma
 Best First Film of a Director - Siva Nageswara Rao
 Best Male Comedian - Brahmanandam

Soundtrack

The music is composed by Sri. Two songs "Lechinde Lediki Parugu" and "Chakravarthiki" were composed by M. M. Keeravani. The soundtrack consists of five songs and are all penned by Sirivennela Seetharama Sastry.

References

External links
 

1993 films
1990s Telugu-language films
1990s buddy comedy films
Indian buddy films
Indian comedy films
Telugu films remade in other languages
Films directed by Siva Nageswara Rao
1993 comedy films